The Great Vanity is a 1641 Baroque allegorical still life painting by the Alsatian artist Sebastian Stoskopff. It is on display in the Musée de l'Œuvre Notre-Dame. Its inventory number is MBA 1249 ("MBA" stands for Musée des Beaux-Arts).

The painting is the last, largest, and most ambitious of Stoskopff's vanitas still-lifes, and the sum of his painterly achievements at this point in his career (Stoskopff had just settled again in his hometown of Strasbourg, after many years in Paris). Among the multiple symbolic elements of its iconography relating to the frailty of existence and death, it quotes an engraving by Jacques Callot, depicting a jester. The three elaborate hanaps in the upper left edge of the painting are faithful depictions of works by Stoskopff's brother-in-law Nicolas Riedinger, a master goldsmith in Strasbourg since 1609. The whole composition consciously repeats Stoskopff's slightly morbid Kitchen Still Life with a Calf's Head from 1640 (see below), which had already been a Memento mori of sorts.

A poem in German written with chalk on a board hanging from the left side of the table reveals the meaning of the painting:

Kunst, Reichtum, Macht und Kühnheit stirbetDie Welt und all ihr Tun verdirbetEin Ewiges kommt nach dieser ZeitIhr Toren, flieht die Eitelkeit.

(Art, Wealth, Power and Audacity dieThe World and all its Doing perishEternity arrives once this Time is overFools that you are, run away from Vanity)

References

External links 

Grande Vanité , presentation on the museum's website

Paintings by Sebastian Stoskopff
Paintings in the Musée de l'Œuvre Notre-Dame
Paintings in the collection of the Musée des Beaux-Arts de Strasbourg
1641 paintings
Skulls in art
Baroque paintings
Allegorical paintings by German artists
Globes
Trompe-l'œil paintings
Oil on canvas paintings
17th-century allegorical paintings